Jára Cimrman Lying, Sleeping is a 1983 Czechoslovak comedy film directed by Ladislav Smoljak. It is a biopic of the fictional Czech national hero Jára Cimrman, who is portrayed by one of his inventors, Zdeněk Svěrák.

The story is framed by an excursion to Liptákov, the (fictional) village where Cimrman allegedly spent the final years of his life. The retrospective passages, which make up the most of the film, span Cimrman's whole "known" life, where he interacts with many personalities of Czech and European science and culture in the Belle Époque. A large portion of the film deals with Cimrman's acting as a tutor in the family of Franz Ferdinand d'Este, the heir presumptive of Austria-Hungary. In this role Cimrman is secretly aiming to "split the monarchy".

Cast
 Zdeněk Svěrák - Jára Cimrman (as Zdeněk Svěrák and Company)
 Valerie Kaplanová - the museum guide
 Petr Čepek - Archduke Franz Ferdinand d'Este / Nývlt, his double
 Josef Abrhám - Theatrical researcher
 Libuše Šafránková - Alžběta
 Ladislav Frej - Marold, painter
 Jiří Zahajský - Dr. Emil Holub, explorer
 Marie Drahokoupilová - the tour courier
 Míla Myslíková - Headmistress
 Jaroslav Vozáb - translator
 Vladimír Svitáček - Professor Kingsley
 Milena Dvorská - Duchess d'Este
 Jiří Kostka - Emperor Franz Joseph I / Macháně, his double
 Petr Kostka - Mánes, painter
 Pavel Vondruška - Johann Strauss II

External links
 

1983 comedy films
1983 films
Czechoslovak black-and-white films
1980s Czech-language films
Films directed by Ladislav Smoljak
Films with screenplays by Zdeněk Svěrák
Czech comedy films
Belle Époque
1980s Czech films